Mark Grimes is a Canadian former politician who served on Toronto City Council from 2003 to 2022. Grimes represented Etobicoke—Lakeshore when it was Ward 6 until 2018 and Ward 3 onwards.

Background
Grimes was born in Orillia and grew up in New Toronto, a neighbourhood of Toronto where he was a paperboy. Prior to politics, he worked as a trader on the Toronto Stock Exchange before starting his own transportation logistics company, MGA International Logistics. He and his wife Anne live in the Alderwood neighbourhood of Toronto with their five children.

Political career
In 2003, Grimes ran as a municipal councillor in Ward 6 Etobicoke-Lakeshore to replace Irene Jones who left the seat to run in the provincial election. He was one of nine candidates to run for the seat. During the campaign he and his closest rival Berardo Mascioli, accused each other of dirty tricks during the election campaign. On election night phone lines to both campaign offices were cut. Grimes won the election by 1,352 votes.

In 2005, Grimes was appointed to the Toronto Transit Commission board but he resigned in 2006 due to a conflict with board chair Howard Moscoe. Grimes seconded a motion of non-confidence in Moscoe over his handling of negotiations with the TTC union. When the vote lost, Grimes immediately resigned. He said continuing to serve on the board would be a waste of time. he said, "Obviously my voice isn't going to be heard."

Although Grimes was generally opposed to initiatives supported by Mayor David Miller, he became a key player in getting the land transfer tax passed in 2007. Grimes proposed a compromise that would see rebates for first time buyers. He said, "I'm not there for the mayor or to play the left wing against the right wing ... Nobody likes new taxes, but I don't want to see libraries and ice rinks and community centres closing."

After the 2010 election he was named chair of the Etobicoke-York Community Council.

In a report dated July 5, 2016, Valerie Jepson, the City of Toronto's integrity commissioner, a lawyer, following a 17-month investigation, produced a 44-page misconduct report on Councillor Mark Grimes. According to a Toronto Star newspaper story, dated July 5, 2016,
Commissioner Jepson found that Councillor Grimes had "breached council rules when he took part in 'improper' dealings with two different developers".
The Star also reported that "Grimes revised an agreement with Davies Smith Developments that resulted in $100,000 less in cash benefits than originally agreed to for one of his ward communities".
And "a side arrangement between Grimes and the developer committed $100,000 for improvements to a local park, but that deal not follow the proper procedures and the improvements never happened, Jepson found".
Further, the story goes on to state that  "The integrity commissioner also found that Grimes improperly used the influence of his office when he appeared in a promotional video for another developer, Empire Communities, in 2014". Grimes cooperated fully with the investigation and agreed to consult with Jepsen on future dealings with Empire Communities. Jepsen recommended that Council impose no penalties and not take any further remedial action.

On November 16, 2018 the OPP charged Grimes along with outgoing city councillor Justin Di Ciano for allegedly filing false campaign expenses for the 2014 municipal elections, contrary to the Municipal Elections Act. A few months later, Grimes was sued by Warren Kinsella after Grimes allegedly failed to pay invoices for services rendered by Kinsella's Daisy Group. Grimes paid a $10,000 retainer to Kinsella, according to the lawsuit. Then-councillor Di Ciano and Grimes hired the firm of strategist Kinsella, to compile a "research" dossier on him and political foes. On February 10, 2020, Grimes was cleared of the non-criminal charge under the Municipal Elections Act as the Crown cited that they could not prove the allegations that had been made.

Grimes was narrowly defeated in the 2022 Toronto municipal election by Amber Morley, four years after she lost to Grimes in the 2018 Toronto municipal election. Grimes had been endorsed by Mayor John Tory both times.

Election results

References

External links

Living people
People from Orillia
Toronto city councillors
Year of birth missing (living people)